Daniel Corso (born April 3, 1978) is a Canadian former professional ice hockey centre.

Playing career
Corso was born in Montreal, Quebec and raised in Saint-Hubert, Quebec. As a youth, he played in the 1992 Quebec International Pee-Wee Hockey Tournament with the Richelieu Champlain minor ice hockey team.

Corso was drafted 169th overall by the St. Louis Blues. He made his NHL debut with the Blues in the 2000–01 season, and later played for the Atlanta Thrashers. Corso played 77 regular season games in the National Hockey League, scoring 14 goals with 11 assists for 25 points and collecting 20 penalty minutes. He also spent two seasons in Germany's Deutsche Eishockey Liga, playing for the Kassel Huskies and the Frankfurt Lions.

On August 14, 2008, Corso signed a one-year contract with Finnish SM-liiga team Kärpät for the 2008–09 season.

During his second season with Timrå IK in 2010–11, Corso was released from his contract and transferred to Belarusian KHL club, HC Dinamo Minsk on December 31, 2010.

Career statistics

Regular season and playoffs

International

Awards and honours

References

External links
 

1978 births
Canadian people of Italian descent
Atlanta Thrashers players
Binghamton Senators players
Canadian ice hockey centres
Chicago Wolves players
HC Dinamo Minsk players
Frankfurt Lions players
Ice hockey people from Montreal
Ilves players
Kassel Huskies players
Lausanne HC players
Living people
EHC Olten players
Oulun Kärpät players
Sportspeople from Longueuil
Philadelphia Phantoms players
St. Louis Blues draft picks
St. Louis Blues players
Springfield Falcons players
Timrå IK players
Torpedo Nizhny Novgorod players
Victoriaville Tigres players
Worcester IceCats players
Yunost Minsk players
Canadian expatriate ice hockey players in Belarus
Canadian expatriate ice hockey players in Finland
Canadian expatriate ice hockey players in Germany
Canadian expatriate ice hockey players in Russia
Canadian expatriate ice hockey players in Switzerland
Canadian expatriate ice hockey players in Sweden